Aquadro is a 2013 Italian drama film directed by Stefano Lodovichi.

Cast
Lorenzo Colombi as Alberto
Maria Vittoria Barrella as Amanda
Ilaria Giachi as Nanà
Gaia Igini as Barbara

References

External links

2013 films
2010s Italian-language films
2013 drama films
Italian drama films
Italian teen films
Films about cyberbullying
2010s Italian films